De Colección may refer to:

De Colección (Verónica Castro album)
De Colección, compilation album by Pimpinela
De Colección, compilation album by José Luis Rodríguez (singer)
De Colección, compilation album by Manolo Galván
De Colección, compilation album by Eduardo Falú